The 34th district of the Texas House of Representatives consists of a portion of Nueces County. The current Representative is Abel Herrero, who has represented the district since 2013.

References 

34